Rebecca Jane Bailey (born 3 September 1974) is a road cyclist from New Zealand. She represented her nation at the 1996 Summer Olympics in the women's road race and women's time trial.

References

External links
 

New Zealand female cyclists
Cyclists at the 1996 Summer Olympics
Olympic cyclists of New Zealand
Living people
Cyclists from Christchurch
1974 births
20th-century New Zealand women